This article lists all rugby league footballers who have played first-grade for the North Queensland Cowboys in the National Rugby League.

Notes:
 Debut: Players are listed in order of player cap number as published by the club on the Cowboys Roll, with inaugural captain Laurie Spina given the honour of being Cowboys player 1.
 Appearances: North Queensland Cowboys games only, not a total of their career games. For example, Brent Tate has played a career total of 229 first-grade games but of those, 67 were at North Queensland.
 Previous Club: refers to the previous first-grade rugby league club (NRL or Super League) the player played at and does not refer to any junior club, rugby union club or a rugby league club he was signed to but never played at.
 The statistics in this table are correct as of round 2 of the 2023 NRL season.

List of players

See also
List of North Queensland Cowboys records
List of North Queensland Cowboys honours
List of North Queensland Cowboys seasons

References

External links
Rugby League Tables / North Queensland Point Scorers
RLP List of Players
RLP North Queensland Cowboys Transfers & Debuts

 
Players
Lists of Australian rugby league players
National Rugby League lists